Kosmos 2425 ( meaning Cosmos 2425) is one of a set of three Russian military satellites launched in 2006 as part of the GLONASS satellite navigation system. It was launched with Kosmos 2424 and Kosmos 2426.

This satellite is a GLONASS-M satellite, also known as Uragan-M. It was assigned GLONASS-M №16 number by the manufacturer and 716 by the Ground Control.

Kosmos 2424 / 2425 / 2426 were launched from Site 81/24 at Baikonur Cosmodrome in Kazakhstan. A Proton-K carrier rocket with a Blok DM upper stage was used to perform the launch which took place at 20:18 UTC on 25 December 2006. The launch successfully placed the satellites into Medium Earth orbit. It subsequently received its Kosmos designation, and the International Designator 2006-062A. The United States Space Command assigned it the Satellite Catalog Number 29670.

It is in the second orbital plane in orbital slot 15. It started operations on 12 October 2007.·

See also

 List of Kosmos satellites (2251–2500)
 List of Proton launches (2000–2009)

References

Spacecraft launched in 2006
Spacecraft launched by Proton rockets
Kosmos satellites